Developed by Monroe Ingberman, a fragment bid is a bidding convention used in the card game contract bridge. It is an unusual jump rebid, usually a double jump, by either the opener or the responder which shows a fit with partner's suit and shortage, either a singleton or void, in the fourth suit.

Although analogous to splinter bids, fragment bids differ in that they require the naming of a suit held rather than the short suit itself.   is required on the details of either splinter or fragment bids and their continuations.

Examples

Fragment bid by opener
 The 4 rebid by opener is a fragment bid; it is double jump showing two or three cards in the fragment suit (hearts), a singleton or void in clubs and support for partner's diamond suit.

Fragment bids by responder
 The 4 bid is a fragment bid showing support for spades and shortness in the unbid suit, diamonds.

 When three suits have been bid naturally, a double jump in the fourth suit is a fragment bid.  The 4 bid shows support for partner's last bid suit (spades) and a singleton in his first suit (clubs).

 If the fragment bidder rebids the suit in which he has promised shortness, he shows a void; in this case in clubs.

See also
Splinter bid

References

Bridge conventions